The USRA 2-8-8-2 was a USRA standard class of steam locomotive designed under the control of the United States Railroad Administration, the nationalized railroad system in the United States during World War I. These locomotives were of 2-8-8-2 wheel arrangement in the Whyte notation, or (1'D)'D1' in UIC classification. A total of 106 locomotives were built to this plan for the USRA; postwar, it became a de facto standard design.

History
While the 2-8-8-2 had been built in the United States since 1909, most development work had gone into making subsequent locomotives larger and heavier. The Norfolk and Western Railway however, had taken development in a different direction. By using smaller cylinders and higher boiler pressure, the result was a locomotive capable of powerful performance, and a turn of speed higher than the  maximum of the ‘traditional’ designs.

The USRA 2-8-8-2 drew heavily on the Norfolk and Western Railway’s Y-2 class locomotive design, as their delegate to the 2-8-8-2 design committee had brought a full set of blueprints.

Original owners

USRA originals

Copies

Survivor
Although no original USRA 2-8-8-2 survives, one of the copies does. Norfolk & Western 2050, a 1923 ALCO product of N&W's Y-3a class, is on display at the Illinois Railway Museum.

References

Notes

Bibliography

https://archive.org/stream/railwayage64newy#page/1038/mode/2up
https://archive.org/stream/railwayage66newy#page/576/mode/2up

USRA locomotives
2-8-8-2 locomotives
ALCO locomotives
Baldwin locomotives
Freight locomotives
Standard gauge locomotives of the United States